Nitin Tyagi (born 16 June 1973) is an Indian politician and member of the Sixth Legislative Assembly of Delhi in India. He represents the Laxmi Nagar constituency of Delhi and is a member of the Aam Aadmi Party political party.

Early life and education
Nitin Tyagi was born in Meerut. He attended the Institute of Management Technology, Ghaziabad and completed Post Graduate Diploma in Management.<Meenakshi Sharma Ex Candidate EDMC Election's>

Political career
Nitin Tyagi was a MLA from 2015. He represented the Laxmi Nagar constituency and is a member of the Aam Aadmi Party political party.

Posts held

  02     Nov.2020        Member DCPCR

See also

Aam Aadmi Party
Delhi Legislative Assembly
Laxmi Nagar (Delhi Assembly constituency)
Politics of India
Sixth Legislative Assembly of Delhi

References 

1973 births
Delhi MLAs 2015–2020
Living people
People from East Delhi district
People from Delhi
Aam Aadmi Party candidates in the 2020 Delhi Legislative Assembly election
Aam Aadmi Party MLAs from Delhi